Sir William Bovill, PC, FRS (26 May 18141 November 1873) was an English lawyer, politician and judge. He served as Chief Justice of the Common Pleas between 1866 and his death in 1873.

Background
Bovill was born at Allhallows, Barking, a younger son of Benjamin Bovill, of Wimbledon, London.

Career
On leaving school, Bovill did not go to university but was articled to a firm of solicitors. He entered the Middle Temple and practised for a short time as a special pleader below the bar. He was called to the bar in 1841 and joined the home circuit. His special training in a solicitor's office, and its resulting connection, combined with a thorough knowledge of the details of engineering, acquired through his interest in a manufacturing firm in the east end of London, soon brought him a very extensive patent and commercial practice.

Bovill became a Queen's Counsel (QC) in 1855, and on 28 March 1857 was elected Member of Parliament (MP) for Guildford. 
In the House of Commons, he was very zealous for legal reform, and the Partnership Law Amendment Act 1865, which he helped to pass, is always referred to as Bovill's Act. 
In 1866, he was appointed Solicitor General, an office which he vacated on becoming Chief Justice of the Common Pleas in succession to Sir William Erle in November of the same year.

Personal life
Bovill had married, in 1844, Maria Bolton, eldest daughter of John Henry Bolton of Lee Park, Blackheath. They lived firstly in London and then moved to Worplesdon, where they made their home at Worplesdon Lodge (later renamed Worplesdon Place).

He died at Kingston upon Thames on 1 November 1873. Maria, Lady Bovill died in London 21 October 1901.

Honours and arms
Bovill was knighted in 1866. In May 1867 he was elected a Fellow of the Royal Society.

References

Attribution:

External links 

 

1814 births
1873 deaths
Chief Justices of the Common Pleas
English barristers
Members of the Parliament of the United Kingdom for Guildford
UK MPs 1857–1859
UK MPs 1859–1865
UK MPs 1865–1868
Solicitors General for England and Wales
19th-century English judges
Fellows of the Royal Society
Members of the Privy Council of the United Kingdom